Ir. Herling Laoh (1902 – 1912 –	15 March 1970), was a Christian Indonesian politician, bureaucrat and entrepreneur from what is today the province North Sulawesi. A member of the nationalistic Indonesian National Party (PNI), he served in a number of cabinet posts during the Indonesian National Revolution, including as Minister of Transportation and Minister of Public Works and Housing. Born to a goldsmith and his wife, in Tompaso, Dutch East Indies. He was the younger brother of Frits Laoh, who would become a politician later in life. He studied at the Technische Hoogeschool te Bandoeng (THB), and graduated in 1928.

Following the proclamation of independence, he joined the PNI and rose through the ranks of the party organization. In 1946, he was appointed Deputy Minister of Public Works and Housing, by Prime Minister Sutan Sjahrir. He served in the position until 1947, when he was appointed minister, after the resignation of Mohammad Enoch. During the Prime Ministership of Mohammad Hatta, he also became Minister of Transportation, while still remaining as Minister of Public Works and Housing. After the end of the National Revolution, he remained active in politics, and was involved in the PRRI/Permesta Rebellion. He was arrested but eventually released in 1967. On 15 March 1970, Herning Laoh died in Indonesia, at the age of between 58 and 68.

Early life and career 

Herling Laoh was born in the town of Tompaso, which was 45 km south-west of the city of Manado, in what is today Minahasa Regency. His date of birth is inconsistent, and varies from source to source, but is somewhere between 1902 and 1912. He was the son of a goldsmith and his wife, from Sonder, Tompaso. He was also the younger brother of Frits Laoh, a politician who also served as transportation minister under Burhanuddin Harahap. He began his education at a technical school, before entering the Europeesche Lagere School (ELS). He continued his education to the Prins Hendrik school (PHS), and later the Hogere Burgerschool (HBS). In May 1928, he graduated from the Technische Hoogeschool te Bandoeng (THB), the predecessor of the Bandung Institute of Technology (ITB), with a degree in Civil Engineering.

During his time there, he befriended future-President Sukarno. In 1937, Laoh became the assistant to Dr. H. S. C. De Vos, and worked on the waterbouwkunde in Bandung. Laoh would also establish three different construction companies, N.V. Birokopi, N.V. Perintis, and N.V. Paka. With the last two being joint ventures with the Dutch government. He continued working in construction, becoming the project engineer for an irrigation project, in Modjokerto, in what is today East Java, and the provincial engineer of water management in Garut and Palembang. During the Japanese occupation, Laoh lived in Tasikmalaya, continuing to work on construction projects.

Later career and death 

Following the Proclamation of Indonesian Independence, Loah joined the newly appointed President Sukarno's Indonesian National Party (PNI). He rose through the ranks of the party organization and was appointed Deputy Minister of Public Works and Housing, by Prime Minister Sutan Sjahrir in Sjahrir's Second Cabinet. He survived a reshuffle in June 1947, and remained as Deputy Minister under Amir Sjarifuddin Harahap. In 1948, he left the office of Deputy Minister to become Minister, replacing his former boss, Mohammad Enoch, who had resigned. He was briefly replaced by Djuanda Kartawidjaja in the first cabinet of Vice President Mohammad Hatta, who served in an acting capacity, but he returned to his position 13 April 1948. During the leadership of the Second Hatta Cabinet, in addition to being minister of Public Works, he was also designated minister of Transportation.

In 1947, Laoh with Deputy Prime Minister Adnan Kapau Gani left Indonesia to go to Havana, Cuba. To attend the economic conference which was held there. During the Second Dutch offensive, which saw the capture of the capital Yogyakarta. This resulted in most of the government being arrested, including Loah. He, and the rest of the government, were eventually released following the signing of the Renville Agreement. In 1949, he participated in the historic transfer of sovereignty from Dutch authorities to Indonesian authorities. In his later life, he would become more critical of President Sukarno's increasing authoritarianism, and Guided Democracy system. In 1958, he joined in the PRRI/Permesta Rebellion in Sulawesi, and took office as State Minister. Though he was arrested, he was released by President Suharto in 1967. On 15 March 1970, he died at the age of 65.

Notes

References

Citations

Sources 

 
 
 
 
 
 
 
 
 

Minahasa people
Indonesian Christians
Government ministers of Indonesia
20th-century births
1970 deaths
Transport ministers of Indonesia